John Lawlor (25 January 1864 – 29 January 1908) was an Australian cricketer. He played three first-class cricket matches for Victoria between 1882 and 1885.

See also
 List of Victoria first-class cricketers

References

External links
 

1864 births
1908 deaths
Australian cricketers
Victoria cricketers
Sportspeople from County Kerry